Pteromalinae is a parasitoid wasp subfamily in the family Pteromalidae.

Genera 
Ablaxia - Abomalus - Acaenacis - Acroclisella - Acroclisis - Acroclisissa - Acroclisoides - Acroclypa - Acrocormus - Afropsilocera - Aggelma - Agiommatus - Aiemea - Allocricellius - Alticornis - Amandia - Amblyharma - Amblypachus - Amphidocius - Andersena - Angulifrons - Anisopteromalus - Anogmoides - Anogmus - Anorbanus - Apelioma - Apsilocera - Apycnetron - Arachnopteromalus - Arriva - Arthrolytus - Atrichomalus - Bairamlia - Boharticus - Bonitoa - Brachycaudonia - Bubekia - Bubekiana - Bulolosa - Bupronotum - Caenacis - Caenocrepis - Callicarolynia - Calliprymna - Callitula - Canada - Canberrana - Capellia - Catolaccus - Cecidolampa - Cecidostiba - Cheiropachus - Chlorocytus - Chrysoglyphe - Coelopisthia - Conigastrus - Conomorium - Coruna - Cryptoprymna - Cyclogastrella - Cyrtogaster - Cyrtoptyx - Dasyneurophaga - Delisleia - Dibrachoides - Dibrachys - Diconocara - Diglochis - Dimachus - Dinarmoides - Dinarmus - Dineuticida - Dinotiscus - Dinotoides - Diourbelia - Dirhicnus - Doganlaria - Dorcatomophaga - Dudichilla - Elachertoidea - Elderia - Endomychobius - Epanogmus - Epicatolaccus - Epipteromalus - Erdoesia - Erdoesina - Erythromalus - Eulonchetron - Eumacepolus - Euneura - Eurydinota - Eurydinoteloides - Eurydinotomorpha - Eutelisca - Euteloida - Ezgia - Fanamokala - Fedelia - Ficicola - Fijita - Frena - Gastracanthus - Gbelcia - Genangula - Globimesosoma - Goidanichium - Golovissima - Grissellium - Guancheria - Gugolzia - Guinea - Guolina - Gyrinophagus - Habritella - Habritys - Habromalina - Halomalus - Halticopterella - Halticopteroides - Hansonita - Helocasis - Hemitrichus - Heteroprymna - Heteroschema - Hillerita - Hlavka - Hobbya - Holcaeus - Homoporus - Huberina - Hypopteromalus - Inkaka - Ischyroptyx - Isocyrtella - Isocyrtus - Isoplatoides - Jaliscoa - Janssoniella - Kaleva - Kazina - Klabonosa - Kratinka - Kratka - Kukua - Kumarella - Lampoterma - Lariophagus - Laticlypa - Leleupia - Lenka - Leodamus - Leptomeraporus - Licteria - Lomonosoffiella - Lonchetron - Longinucha - Lyrcus - Lysirina - Makaronesa - Maorita - Marangua - Mazinawa - Megadicylus - Merallus - Meraporus - Merismoclea - Merismomorpha - Merisus - Mesopolobus - Metacolus - Metastenus - Meximalus - Micradelus - Mimencyrtus - Mirekia - Miristhma - Miscogasteriella - Mokrzeckia - Monazosa - Monoksa - Muscidifurax - Nadelaia - Narendrella - Nasonia - Nazgulia - Neanica - Nedinotus - Neocatolaccus - Neocylus - Neopolycystus - Neotoxeumorpha - Nephelomalus - Nikolskayana - Norbanus - Notoglyptus - Notoprymna - Novitzkyanus - Nuchata - Oaxa - Obalana - Ogloblinisca - Oniticellobia - Oomara - Oricoruna - Ottaria - Ottawita - Oxyharma - Oxysychus - Pachycrepoideus - Pachyneuron - Pandelus - Parabruchobius - Paracarotomus - Paracroclisis - Paradinarmus - Paraiemea - Paroxyharma - Pegopus - Peridesmia - Perilampidea - Perniphora - Pestra - Pezilepsis - Phaenocytus - Platecrizotes - Platneptis - Platygerrhus - Platypteromalus - Ploskana - Plutothrix - Polstonia - Procallitula - Promerisus - Propicroscytus - Propodeia - Pseudanogmus - Pseudetroxys - Pseudocatolaccus - Psilocera - Psilonotus - Psychophagoides - Psychophagus - Pterapicus - Pterisemoppa - Pteromalus - Pterosemigastra - Pterosemopsis - Ptinocida - Pycnetron - Quercanus - Rakosina - Raspela - Rhaphitelus - Rhopalicus - Rohatina - Roptrocerus - Sceptrothelys - Schizonotus - Sedma - Selimnus - Sigynia - Sisyridivora - Sorosina - Spaniopus - Sphegigaster - Sphegigastrella - Sphegipterosema - Sphegipterosemella - Spilomalus - Spintherus - Spodophagus - Staurothyreus - Stenetra - Stenomalina - Stenoselma - Stichocrepis - Stinoplus - Strejcekia - Synedrus - Syntomopus - Systasis - Systellogaster - Szelenyinus - Tanina - Termolampa - Thureonella - Tomicobia - Toxeuma - Toxeumella - Toxeumelloides - Toxeumorpha - Trichargyrus - Trichokaleva - Trichomalopsis - Trichomalus - Tricolas - Trigonoderus - Trigonogastrella - Trinotiscus - Tripteromalus - Tritneptis - Trjapitzinia - Trychnosoma - Tsela - Uniclypea - Urolepis - Usubaia - Veltrusia - Vespita - Vrestovia - Xiphydriophagus - Yanchepia - Yosemitea - Zdenekiana

References

External links 

Pteromalidae
Hymenoptera subfamilies